Hopea longirostrata is a tree in the family Dipterocarpaceae, native to Borneo. The specific epithet longirostrata means "long-beaked", referring to the shape of the fruit.

Description
It has thin buttresses. The bark is smooth.

Distribution and habitat
Hopea longirostrata is endemic to Borneo, where it is confined to Sarawak.

Conservation
Hopea longirostrata has been assessed as endangered on the IUCN Red List. It is threatened by logging for its timber and by land conversion for palm oil plantations. The species is protected in Semenggoh Nature Reserve.

References

longirostrata
Endemic flora of Borneo
Flora of Sarawak
Plants described in 1967